Bosanac is a South Slavic surname. Variations of the surname include Besanko and Bosanko. Through migration the name can be found in the United Kingdom and Australia.

Notable people with the surname include:

 Vesna Bosanac, Croatian physician involved in the Battle of Vukovar
 Tomo Bosanac, Croatian electrical engineering professor, member of the Croatian Academy of Sciences and Arts
 Bosco Bosanac, Australian bassist of The Atlantics